The naval Battle of Puerto de Cavite (Filipino: Labanan sa Puerto ng Cavite) took place on 10 June 1647 during the Eighty Years' War between a Spanish fleet and a Dutch fleet in Puerto de Cavite, an important Spanish port in Manila Bay, Philippines in which the Dutch were defeated.

Battle
Twelve Dutch ships besieged Puerto de Cavite, the home of the Manila galleons, on 10 June. The Spaniards and Filipinos defended the port with artillery fire and sank the Dutch flagship. Subsequently, the Dutch left with the Spaniards and Filipinos still maintaining control over the port. This came at a great cost since Porta Vaga, a Spanish stone fort that defended the area, was destroyed. The Dutch then went on to harass the Manila Bay area until the war's end in 1648 with the Treaty of Münster.

Port
The port, Puerto de Cavite, was one of many important Spanish naval possessions in Manila Bay in the Captaincy General of the Philippines, and facilitated the Manila galleons trade between the Philippines and New Spain (present day Mexico). Puerto de Cavite is located in present-day Cavite City.

See also
Battles La Naval de Manila
Spanish East Indies

Puerto de Cavite
Puerto de Cavite
Puerto de Cavite
Puerto de Cavite 1647
Puerto de Cavite 1647
History of the Philippines (1565–1898)
1647 in Southeast Asia
History of Cavite
Cavite City
Eighty Years' War (1621–1648)